Meridian 5, also known as Meridian No.15L, was a communications satellite launched by the Russian Federal Space Agency which was lost in a launch failure in December 2011. It would have been operated by the newly formed Russian Aerospace Defence Forces.

Meridian 5 was launched on a Soyuz-2.1b rocket with a Fregat upper stage, from Site 43/4 at the Plesetsk Cosmodrome. The launch took place at 12:08 UTC on 23 December 2011, with the rocket performing nominally during first and second stage flight. At 288 seconds after launch, the Blok I third stage's RD-0124 engine ignited to begin its burn. During third stage flight, an anomaly occurred which prevented the rocket from reaching orbit.

An official spokesman stated that the launch had been terminated 421 seconds into flight, by means of the rocket's thrust termination system. Telemetry recorded by NPO Lavochkin, however, indicated that the rocket had veered off course 425 seconds after launch, with data suggesting that there had been an explosion. Another report indicated that the engine had lost thrust 427 seconds after launch. It was the first orbital launch to be conducted by the Aerospace Defence Forces, which had been formed at the beginning of the month.

Debris from the launch fell over the Novosibirsk Oblast in Siberia, near Ordynsk. One piece of debris fell through the roof of a house in Cosmonaut Street in the village of Vagaitsevo. Despite debris falling in residential areas, no injuries were reported.

See also

 Progress M-12M

References

Spacecraft launched in 2011
Satellite launch failures
Spacecraft launched by Soyuz-2 rockets
Meridian satellites
2011 in Russia
Space accidents and incidents in Russia